Peter Marshall Murray, M.D. (June 9, 1888 – December 19, 1969) was president of the National Medical Association from 1932 to 1933.

Biography
He was born on June 9, 1888, in Houma, Louisiana to John L. Murray and Louvinia Smith. He attended Dillard University and graduated in 1910. In 1914 he was awarded his M.D. from Howard University. He interned at Freedmen's Hospital and then taught at Howard University. He served on the Howard University Board of Trustees.

He married Charlotte Wallace in Washington, DC on July 2, 1917. In 1920 they lived in the Truxton Circle neighborhood at 1645 New Jersey Ave NW with Charlotte's mother, her 23 year old sister, and a live-in domestic servant. Charlotte and her sister Sametta worked as teachers. In July 1921, the Murrays had a son, John. In 1921 the family moved to New York City to live in Harlem.

He became an attending physician at Sydenham Hospital.

In 1956, his portrait was painted by artist Betsy Graves Reyneau. The portrait is currently held by the National Portrait Gallery, Smithsonian Institution as a gift of the Harmon Foundation. 

He was president of the National Medical Association from 1932 to 1933. He died on December 19, 1969.

References

Physicians from New York (state)
African-American physicians
1888 births
1969 deaths
Dillard University alumni
Howard University alumni
Howard University faculty
20th-century African-American people